The 2004 McNeese State Cowboys football team was an American football team that represented McNeese State University as a member of the Southland Conference (Southland) during the 2004 NCAA Division I-AA football season. In their fifth year under head coach Tommy Tate, the team compiled an overall record of 4–7, with a mark of 1–4 in conference play, and finished tied for fifth in the Southland.

Schedule

References

McNeese State
McNeese Cowboys football seasons
McNeese State Cowyboys football